Rock n Roll Consciousness is the fifth studio album by American rock musician Thurston Moore. The album was released on 28 April 2017 by Caroline Records worldwide and Fiction Records in Europe and the United States.

The album was produced by Paul Epworth.

Accolades

Track listing

Personnel 
 Thurston Moore – vocals, guitars
 James Sedwards – guitars
 Debbie Googe – bass guitars, backing vocals
 Steve Shelley – drums, percussions
 Paul Epworth – producing
 Randall Dunn – mixing
 Jason Ward – mastering
 Syd Kemp – mixing, engineering on "Mx.Liberty" and "Cease Fire"

Charts

References 

2017 albums
Thurston Moore albums
Caroline Records albums
Fiction Records albums
Albums produced by Paul Epworth